The Four Masked Men is a 1934 British crime film directed by George Pearson and starring John Stuart, Judy Kelly and Richard Cooper. It was adapted by Cyril Campion from his play, "The Masqueraders." Its plot concerns a man who hunts down the criminal gang responsible for several robberies and the murder of his brother.

Cast
 John Stuart as Trevor Phillips
 Judy Kelly as Patricia Brent
 Miles Mander as Rodney Fraser
 Richard Cooper as Lord Richard Clyne
 Athole Stewart as Colonel St. John Clive
 Sebastian Shaw as Arthur Phillips
 Victor Stanley as Potter

References

1934 films
1934 crime films
British crime films
1930s English-language films
British black-and-white films
1930s British films